Weddington High School (WHS) is a public high school located east of Weddington, North Carolina (with a Matthews mailing address) as part of Union County Public Schools. As of August 2020, the school has been operating under the leadership of principal Jeff Kraftson.  Weddington's important feeder schools, Weddington Elementary and Weddington Middle, are located on the same campus as the high school. Other feeder schools include Antioch Elementary, in Matthews/Indian Trail, and Wesley Chapel Elementary, in Monroe. WHS mainly serves Weddington, Wesley Chapel and the Union County portion of Matthews. It also has some students from western Monroe.

Academics 
As of 2011, Weddington had the highest graduation rate of seniors in the state of North Carolina for the fifth year in a row, with the graduation rate going up from 91.7% to 95.7%.

Weddington is an Honors School of Excellence with high growth. To be recognized as an Honors School of Excellence, a school must have 90% or above of their composite End of Course Test scores above grade level. Weddington's test scores are the highest in Union County.

Weddington High School was on Newsweek magazine's "2013 America's Best High Schools" list.  Weddington ranked 470th out of 2000 national schools. There are over 18,000 high schools in the United States, placing Weddington in the top three percent.

Programs 
The Weddington High School marching band's 2013–2014 director, Jill Brooks, was selected as the recipient of the 2013–2014 American School Band Directors Association Outstanding Potential Award. The band was also highlighted in an issue of Appleseed Magazine for showing the power of music along with the levels of hard work and enthusiasm required to exist in a marching band.

As of 2013, Weddington provides its students with a Marine Corps JROTC program. Instructed by retired Marines Lieutenant Colonel David Morgan and First Sergeant Randall Barlow, the program has won two over-all awards from Union County drill meets, along with a host of other drill awards in just its first two years. Weddington's MCJROTC program, as of 2015, consists of about 60 cadets. In May 2017, the MJROTC Women's Athletic Team finished 3rd in the National Competition, held in San Diego, California.

Athletics 

The school has earned North Carolina High School Athletic Association (NCHSAA) State Championships in the following sports:
 (2003–2004): Women's Cross Country 
 (2009–2010): Cheerleading
 (2012–2013): Baseball
 (2013–2014): Baseball, Men's Cross Country
 (2015–2016): Men's Cross Country, Men's Soccer, Men's Indoor Track & Field, Women's Soccer
 (2016–2017): Football, Men's Lacrosse, Men's Tennis, Men's Outdoor Track & Field, Women's Soccer
 (2017–2018): Men’s Indoor Track & Field, Men’s Outdoor Track & Field, Men’s Lacrosse
 (2018–2019): Football, Men’s Cross Country, Men's Indoor Track & Field, Men's Outdoor Track & Field, Men's Lacrosse
 (2019–2020): Football, Men's Indoor Track & Field
 (2020–2021): Men's Basketball, Men's Soccer

Weddington has also earned over a dozen of the NCHSAA Team Scholar Athlete Awards for having the highest team GPA, regardless of classification.

Notable alumni 
 Ayesha Curry (c/o 2007), actress, author, television personality
 Keith Duncan (c/o 2016), former All-American football kicker for the Iowa Hawkeyes
 Darius Kilgo (c/o 2010), NFL defensive lineman and two-time Super Bowl champion
 Stephanie Watts (c/o 2015), WNBA player
 Will Shipley (c/o 2021), Starting running back for the Clemson Tigers

References

Public high schools in North Carolina
Schools in Union County, North Carolina
2000 establishments in North Carolina
Educational institutions established in 2000